The 8th All Africa Games were 5–17 October 2003 in Abuja, Nigeria. 53 countries participated in 23 sports. The main venue was the newly constructed Abuja Stadium. The organizing committee was headed by Nigerian Amos Adamu.

Venues

 National Stadium – Athletics, Football (finals), Para sports
 Main Gymnasium, ASC – Gymnastics, Handball, Judo, Karate, Para sports
 Racket Squash Courts (ASC) – Squash
 Main Swimming Pool – Swimming, Para sports
 Gymnasium (ASC) – Taekwondo
 Main Sports Hall (ASC) – Volleyball, Para sports
 Ladi Kwali Hall, Sheraton, Abuja – Badminton, Para sports, Wrestling
 Old Parade Ground – Baseball, Softball
 Scorpion Sports Hall, Guards Brigade – Basketball
 International Conference Centre – Boxing
 Agura Hotel – Chess
 Roads – Cycling
 Lagos – Football
 Kaduna – Football
 Bauchi – Football
 Calabar – Football
 Hockey Stadium, Hockey Training Pitch – Hockey
 Yakubu Gowon Barracks – Squash
 Congress Hall, Hilton – Table tennis
 National Centre for Women's Development – Weightlifting, Para sports

Participating nations
Among the countries that participated at the 2003 All Africa Games were:

 DR Congo

 Ethiopia

Sports
22 disciplines were contested at the 2003 All Africa Games, among them:

Special Sports:

 Para-athletics

 Para table tennis

Medal standings

References

External links
List of Ghana athletes at the 2003 All-Africa Games
Athletics results – gbrathletics.com
Various results – sports123.com

 
All-Africa Games
All-Africa Games
All-Africa Games
African Games
International sports competitions hosted by Nigeria
Sports competitions in Abuja
Multi-sport events in Nigeria
21st century in Abuja
October 2003 sports events in Africa